In WLAN, packets can be a stream of video, voice, or data which each has different priority to be served by an Access Point device.  Traffic Identifier (TID) is an identifier used to classify a packet in Wireless LAN.  When base station receives an 802.11 frame with TID set for audio, for example, the priority is given higher than a data frame for best effort purpose.

TID Target Identifier (not traffic identifier) is part of a QoS concept in Wireless LAN introduced by the Institute of Electrical and Electronics Engineers in 802.11e as part of 802.11 standards family.  It is represented as a four-bits number (0-3) identifying a QoS traffic within MAC data service.  There are 16 (24) possible values for TID, out of it only 8 are practically usable to identify differentiated services. The values of TID is similar to values used in Differentiated services.

The TID subfield sits in certain MAC frames.  The presence of QoS, thus the presence of TID, is determined by the value set in the MSB of subtype field (bit b7) of Frame control field. A QoS-enabled MAC layer of 802.11 protocol stack uses the TIDs to classify and prioritizes processing of incoming or outgoing frames.

References

External links

Approval from the IEEE RevCom
802.11e TGe Status (finished)
802.11e Amendment
QoX: What is It Really

E